Gorenja Vas pri Šmarjeti is a village immediately west of Šmarjeta in the Municipality of Šmarješke Toplice in southeastern Slovenia. The area is part of the historical region of Lower Carniola. The municipality is now included in the Southeast Slovenia Statistical Region. The settlement includes the hamlets of Mevce to the northwest, Podkrajec to the north, and Dolina, Hrib, and Ravnik to the west.

Name
The name of the settlement was changed from Gorenja  vas (literally 'upper village') to Gorenja vas pri Šmarjeti (literally, 'upper village near Šmarjeta') in 1953. In the past the German name was Oberdorf.

History
A manor farm belonging to Šuta Castle in Šmarjeta once stood in the village. It was subdivided and sold off by Ignac Bogataj in 1857. During the Second World War, the Partisans had an encampment in the hills west of the village.

References

External links
Gorenja Vas pri Šmarjeti at Geopedia

Populated places in the Municipality of Šmarješke Toplice